Coripata is a town in the La Paz Department, Bolivia.

References 

 Instituto Nacional de Estadistica de Bolivia

Populated places in La Paz Department (Bolivia)